After the 1969 classical / rock fusion Concerto for Group and Orchestra, Jon Lord was commissioned to write a follow-up. This was Gemini Suite, five long movements inspired by the members of Deep Purple, and performed live in September 1970 at the Royal Festival Hall with The Light Music Society Orchestra (the album of the concert was issued in 1993 as Gemini Suite Live). Jon Lord then recorded it in the studio as his first solo project in 1971, with the London Symphony Orchestra conducted by Malcolm Arnold and soloists drawn from the rock world. Gemini Suite was an important step for Lord and led to albums such as Windows (1974) and Sarabande (1976).

The album was originally released in Europe and America in 1971 with different cover artwork. The 1973 US reissue featured a third version of the cover artwork. In 1983 the album was re-released on LP in Germany and four years later also for the first time on CD. The digital remastered version of the album premiered on CD in 2008.

Studio album track listing 
 "Guitar" - Soloist: Albert Lee
 "Piano" - Soloist: Jon Lord
 "Drums" - Soloist: Ian Paice
 "Vocals" - Soloist: Yvonne Elliman and Tony Ashton
 "Bass guitar" - Soloist: Roger Glover
 "Organ" - Soloist: Jon Lord

Musicians  

 Jon Lord : piano, organ
 Tony Ashton : vocals
 Yvonne Elliman : vocals
 Albert Lee : guitar
 Roger Glover : bass
 Ian Paice : drums
 London Symphony Orchestra conducted by sir Malcolm Arnold

Charts

Production notes 
Composed and scored by Jon Lord
Lyrics by Jon Lord
Recorded at Abbey Road and De Lane Lea studios, London, March 1971
Studio engineers: Mike Gray, Philip McDonald, Dave Stock
Mixed by Martin Birch
(2008 release) Tape archiving, sound restoration and digital remastering: Nick Watson, Fluid Studio

References

Deep Purple
Compositions by Jon Lord
Orchestral suites
Purple Records albums
Capitol Records albums
1971 debut albums